1983 in Korea may refer to:
1983 in North Korea
1983 in South Korea